A sanctuary lamp, chancel lamp, altar lamp, everlasting light, or eternal flame is a light that shines before the altar of sanctuaries in many Jewish and Christian places of worship. Prescribed in Exodus 27:20-21 of the Torah, this icon has taken on different meanings in each of the religions that have adopted it. The passage, which refers to prescriptions for the tabernacle, states:

In Jewish tradition

 

In Judaism, the sanctuary lamp is known by its Hebrew name, Ner Tamid (Hebrew: "eternal flame" or "eternal light"). Hanging or standing in front of the ark in every Jewish synagogue, it is meant to represent the menorah of the Temple in Jerusalem as well as the continuously burning fire on the altar of burnt offerings in front of the Temple. It also symbolizes God's eternal presence and is therefore never extinguished. It is also intended to draw parallels between God and fire, or light, which is emphasized throughout the book of Exodus in the Torah.

These lights are never allowed to dim or go out, and in the case of electric problems, alternative emergency energy sources are used to prevent it from diminishing. 

Though once fuelled by oil, most today are electric lights.

Hanukkah story

The eternal light is central to one of many stories behind the celebration of the Jewish festival of Hanukkah. When the ancient Maccabees rebelled and reclaimed the Temple in Jerusalem, they rekindled the eternal light. However, there was only enough oil to keep the flame burning for one day, and it took eight days to bring new oil. Miraculously, according to the story as recounted in the Talmud, the flame continued to burn until the new oil arrived.

Today, Jewish celebrations of Hanukkah include the lighting of the Hanukkah menorah (Hanukkiyah), which has nine branches: including one for the candle used to light the eight flames (candles or wicks in oil), recalling the story.

In Christian tradition

Some Christian churches have at least one lamp continually burning before the tabernacle, not only as an ornament of the altar, but for the purpose of worship. The General Instruction of the Roman Missal in the Catholic Church, for instance, states (in 316): "In accordance with traditional custom, near the tabernacle a special lamp, fueled by oil or wax, should be kept alight to indicate and honor the presence of Christ." The sanctuary lamp, also called a chancel lamp, is placed before the tabernacle or aumbry in Roman Catholic churches as a sign that the Lord is present, and in Old Catholic and Anglican churches as a sign that the Blessed Sacrament is reserved or stored. It is also found in the chancel of Lutheran and Methodist churches to indicate the presence of Christ in the sanctuary, as well as a belief in the Real Presence of Christ in the Eucharist. The sanctuary lamp may also be seen in Eastern Orthodox Churches. Other Christian denominations burn the lamp to show that the light of Christ always burns in a sin-darkened world. With influence from Judaism in the Old Testament, God told Moses that a lamp filled with the pure oil should perpetually burn in the Tabernacle (Ex 27:20-21). This is the precedent for the Catholic Church's custom of burning a candle (at all times) before the tabernacle – the gold house where the Eucharistic Body of Christ is reserved under lock and key.

Such sanctuary or tabernacle lamps are often coloured red, though this is not prescribed by law. This serves to distinguish this light from other votive lights within the church. In the Catholic Church, red is widely used despite the preference for white expressed by Fortescue. The use of multiple lights, always in odd numbers, i.e., three, five, seven, or more, in place of a single lamp has now become rarer, though it is still seen in some older Catholic churches and in eastern Christian churches. The lamp may be suspended by a rope or chain over the tabernacle or near the entry of the sanctuary, or it may be affixed to a wall; it is also sometimes placed on a ledge beside the tabernacle or on an individual stand placed on the floor, as seen in the image of St. Martin's Church, Kortrijk, Belgium, in the article Church tabernacle. Oil lamps or candles may be used.

Secular references to the Sanctuary lamp

In the United States, the Boy Scout Jewish religious emblem, a medal earned by scouts for meeting certain requirements of religious activity and education, is called the Ner Tamid.

There is a song by Matisyahu called "Aish Tamid" ("eternal flame") that appears on his albums Shake Off the Dust... Arise (2004) and Live at Stubb's (2006).

See also
 Eternal flame

References

External links
New Advent Catholic Encyclopedia: Altar Lamp
 

Eucharistic objects
Synagogue architecture
Christian symbols
Jewish symbols
Ceremonial flames
Fire in religion